Khabarovsk Cathedral may refer to:

 Khabarovsk Metropolitan Cathedral
 Khabarovsk City Cathedral